John Wallbanks (7 July 1905 – 1987) was an English footballer who played as a forward.

Born in Hindley, Wigan, Wallbanks started his professional career with Barnsley, where he was the club's top goalscorer for four consecutive seasons. He went on to play for Chester and Bradford Park Avenue before joining Wigan Athletic in 1936.

References

1905 births
1987 deaths
People from Hindley, Greater Manchester
English footballers
Association football forwards
Barnsley F.C. players
English Football League players
Chester City F.C. players
Bradford (Park Avenue) A.F.C. players
Wigan Athletic F.C. players
Footballers from Greater Manchester
Portsmouth F.C. players